Club de Rugby Cisneros is a Spanish rugby union club. The club currently competes in the Division de Honor, the top-flight competition of Spanish club rugby. The club is based in Madrid, Spain.

Honours
División de Honor: 2
Champions: 1975–76, 1984–85
Copa del Rey: 4
Champions: 1967, 1969, 1979, 1982

Season by season

33 seasons in División de Honor

See also
 Rugby union in Spain

External links
CR Cisneros Official Website
Spanish Rugby website

Spanish rugby union teams
Sports teams in Madrid
Rugby clubs established in 1945